Mustilia fusca is a moth in the family Endromidae first described by Yasunori Kishida in 1993. It is found in Taiwan.

The larvae feed on the leaves of Trochodendron aralioides. They have a greenish-brown body and head. They reach a length of 45 mm when full grown. Pupation takes place in a black, rough and rugose (wrinkled) pupa, enclosed in a thin cocoon of brown silk spun among the leaves of the host plant.

References

Moths described in 1993
Mustilia